The river Helge or, in Swedish, Helgeån, alternatively Helge å, (lit. 'The Holy river) is a river which flows through Småland and Skåne in southern Sweden. The course of the river takes it through Kristianstad and out to the Hanöbukten in the Baltic Sea.

In the southern parts, there are large wetland areas with a rich bird life. The Kristianstad water kingdom biosphere reserve is located near Kristianstad. Within the catchment area, there are 14 major lakes and 16 watercourses designated as being of national or regional value. There are also 64 Natura 2000 areas, 14 of which have been established because of their high nature values in the water.

See also
Battle of Helgeå

References

Småland
Scania
Drainage basins of the Baltic Sea
Rivers of Skåne County
Ramsar sites in Sweden